The history of Tasmania begins at the end of the most recent ice age (approximately 10,000 years ago) when it is believed that the island was joined to the Australian mainland. Little is known of the human history of the island until the British colonisation in the 19th century.

Indigenous people

Tasmania was inhabited by an Indigenous population, the Aboriginal Tasmanians, and evidence indicates their presence in the territory, later to become an island, at least 35,000 years ago. At the time of the British occupation and colonisation in 1803 the Indigenous population was estimated at between 3000 and 10,000. Historian Lyndall Ryan's analysis of population studies led her to conclude that there were about 7000 spread throughout the island's nine nations; Nicholas Clements, citing research by N.J.B. Plomley and Rhys Jones, settled on a figure of 3000 to 4000.

The combination of the so-called Black War, internecine conflict and, from the late 1820s, the spread of infectious diseases to which they had no immunity, reduced the population to about 300 by 1833. Almost all of the Indigenous population was relocated to Flinders Island by George Augustus Robinson. Until the 1970s, most people thought that the last surviving Tasmanian Aboriginal person was Truganini, who died in 1876. However, this "extinction" was a myth, as documented by Lyndall Ryan in 1991.

European arrival

The first reported sighting of Tasmania by a European was on 24 November 1642 by the Dutch explorer Abel Tasman, who named the island Anthoonij van Diemenslandt, after his sponsor, the Governor of the Dutch East Indies. The name was later shortened to Van Diemen's Land by the British. In 1772, a French expedition led by Marc-Joseph Marion du Fresne landed on the island. Captain James Cook also sighted the island in 1777, and numerous other European seafarers made landfalls, adding a colourful array to the names of topographical features.

The first settlement was by the British at Risdon Cove on the eastern bank of the Derwent estuary in 1803, by a small party sent from Sydney, under Lt. John Bowen. An alternative settlement was established by Capt. David Collins 5 km to the south in 1804 in Sullivans Cove on the western side of the Derwent, where fresh water was more plentiful. The latter settlement became known as Hobart Town, later shortened to Hobart, after the British Colonial Secretary of the time, Lord Hobart. The settlement at Risdon was later abandoned.

The early settlers were mostly convicts and their military guards, with the task of developing agriculture and other industries. Numerous other convict settlements were made in Van Diemens Land, including secondary prisons, such as the particularly harsh penal colonies at Port Arthur in the south-east and Macquarie Harbour on the West Coast. The Aboriginal resistance to this invasion was so strong, that troops were deployed across much of Tasmania to drive the Aboriginal people into captivity on nearby islands.

Timeline

Pre-1800
 Date unknown (BC): Mouheneener band of South-East Tasmanian Aboriginal peoples settle in what is now the Hobart area
 1642: Abel Tasman, of the Dutch East India Company, becomes first European to sight Tasmanian mainland; he names it Van Diemen's Land after fellow Dutch East Indies (now Indonesia) Governor-General Anthony van Diemen
 1792: Captain William Bligh anchors in Adventure Bay for a second time and names Table Mountain (now Mount Wellington)
 1793: French explorer Bruni d'Entrecasteaux surveys Derwent, naming it Riviere du Nord
 1793: John Hayes, of British East India Company, unaware of the French visit, sails up the river, which he names Derwent
 1798: Explorers George Bass and Matthew Flinders visit Derwent as part of circumnavigation of Van Diemen's Land; Bass climbs at least part of Mount Wellington (then known as Table Mountain) on Christmas Day
 1798: Adventure Bay became the site of a whaling station, then later on a Timber station.

1800–1809

 1802: French explorer Nicolas Baudin surveys Derwent during month-long visit to South-East Tasmania, on which his party makes extensive notes on Aboriginal people, plants and animals.
 1803: Lieutenant John Bowen's 49-member party, with the ships  and Albion, starts first British settlement of Tasmania at Risdon Cove, naming it Hobart.
 1804: Lieutenant-Colonel David Collins' 262-member party lands at Sullivans Cove in February; the settlement, which becomes known as Hobart Town, grows to 433 with arrival in June of rest of his Port Phillip party.
 1804: Soldiers temporarily refuse guard duties at Risdon amid fears of convict rebellion.
 1804: Aboriginal people killed in Risdon affray and settlement there abandoned.
 1804: Church of England clergyman Robert Knopwood conducts first divine service at Sullivans Cove.
 1804: Hobart's first cemetery opens, later St David's Park.
 1804: Colonel William Paterson establishes Port Dalrymple (Tamar River) settlement, first at George Town, then at York Town on river's western side.
 1805: After supply ships fail to arrive on time, famine forces David Collins to cut rations by one-third
 1805: Collins leaves tent home to take up residence in first Government House, a wooden cottage.
 1805: Harbourmaster William Collins establishes Australia's first whaling station at Ralphs Bay.
 1805: First land grants include 10 acres (40,000 m2) to Robert Knopwood
 1806: Colonel William Paterson begins transfer of York Town settlement to site of modern Launceston
 1807: Lieutenant Thomas Laycock leads five-man party on first overland journey from Launceston to Hobart, taking nine days, mainly to seek supplies for the northern settlement.
 1809: Deposed New South Wales Governor William Bligh arrives in Hobart and temporarily disrupts David Collins' authority as lieutenant-governor.
 1809: Floods in Derwent

1810–1819

 1810: David Collins dies suddenly, Lieutenant Edward Lord takes over and first of three administrators pending appointment of second lieutenant-governor.
 1810: First church, St David's, built
 1810: Colony's first flour mill built beside Rivulet between Murray St and Elizabeth St, operated by Edward Lord and William Collins
 1810: Administration launches colony's first newspaper, the Derwent Star and Van Diemen's Land Intelligencer
 1810: Sealing expedition discovers Macquarie Island
 1811: After arriving from Sydney, Governor Lachlan Macquarie draws up plan for Hobart streets and orders construction of public buildings and Mount Nelson signal station.
 1812: Michael Howe (later bushranging gang leader) among first convicts to arrive directly from England in HMS Indefatigable
 1812: Northern Tasmania's lieutenant-governorship ceases, Government House in Hobart takes control of whole island
 1813: Schooner Unity not heard of again after convicts seize it in Derwent
 1813: First Post Office opens in postmaster's house on corner of Argyle St and Macquarie St
 1814: Work starts on Anglesea Barracks, Australia's longest continuously occupied military building
 1814: Colony's first horse races believed to have taken place at New Town
 1814: Lieutenant-governor's court created to deal with small personal financial disputes.
 1814: Governor Lachlan Macquarie offers amnesty to bushrangers
 1814: Ship Argo disappears after seizure by convicts in Derwent
 1815: Michael Howe's bushranging gang kills two settlers in New Norfolk raid
 1815: Lieutenant-Governor Thomas Davey declares martial law against all bushrangers, mainly escaped convicts, with some military deserters; Governor Lachlan Macquarie later revokes order.
 1815: Captain James Kelly circumnavigates island in whaleboat
 1815: First Van Diemen's Land wheat shipment to Sydney.
 1816: First emigrant ship arrives with free settlers from England
 1817: Weekly mail service begins between Hobart and Launceston
 1817: Work starts on new St David's Church, replacing earlier structure blown down in storm
 1817: First convict ships arrive directly from England
 1817: New Government House occupied in Macquarie St, on site of present Town Hall, lower Elizabeth St and Franklin Square.
 1818: Government opens flour mill in Hobart
 1818: Soldiers and convict kill bushranger Michael Howe on banks of Shannon River
 1818: Government establishes nucleus of Royal Tasmanian Botanical Gardens
 1819: First proper hospital opens
 1819: Hobart-New Norfolk road built
 1819: St David's Church opens

1820–1829
In 1820, Tasmanian roads were first macadamised and carthorses began to replace bullocks. In the same year, the first substantial jail was completed on the corner of Macquarie Street and Murray Street and merino sheep arrived from John Macarthur's stud in New South Wales. 1820 also saw the first Wesleyan (Methodist) meeting in the colony. The following year marked the arrival of first Catholic clergyman, Father Phillip Conolly and on his second visit, Governor Lachlan Macquarie chooses sites for Perth, Campbell Town, Ross, Oatlands, Sorell and Brighton. In 1821, officials and convicts left Port Dalrymple to establish Macquarie Harbour penal settlement at Sarah Island.

1822 was the first year Van Diemen's Land Agricultural Society held a meeting in Hobart. In 1823 the Presbyterian Church's first official ministry in Australia occurred in Hobart and the first Tasmanian bank, Bank of Van Diemen's Land, was established.

The inauguration of the Supreme Court occurred in 1824, as did the opening of Cascade Brewery, Australia's longest continuously operating Brewery. Cannibal convict Alexander Pearce was hanged after escaping twice from Macquarie Harbour who survived by eating his companions and convict Matthew Brady begins his bushranging career after escaping from Macquarie Harbour.

On 3 December 1825, Van Diemen's Land became an independent colony from New South Wales with an appointed Executive Council, its own judicial establishment, and Legislative Council. Also in that year, the Richmond Bridge, Australia's oldest existing bridge, was opened and a party of soldiers and convicts establishes Maria Island penal settlement

In 1826, Van Diemen's Land Company launches North-West pastoral and agricultural development at Circular Head and the Tasmanian Turf Club was established. Settler John Batman, later one of Melbourne's founders, helped capture bushranger Matthew Brady near Launceston. Hobart experienced a disease epidemic which was blamed on rivulet pollution. A courthouse was built on the corner of Macquarie Street and Murray Street and street lighting with oil lamps was introduced. 1826 was also the year that the Legislative Council met formally for the first time.

1827 saw the first regatta-style events on Derwent River and Van Diemen's Land Company began settlement at Emu Bay (now Burnie).

A proclamation made in 1828 by Lieutenant-Governor George Arthur excluded Aboriginal people from settled areas and was the year of the Cape Grim massacre. In 1828, martial law was also declared against Aboriginal people in settled areas after Van Diemen's Land Company shepherds killed 30 Aboriginal people at Cape Grim and regular mail services with Sydney began. That year also saw widespread floods. The following year a jail for women convicts ("female factory") opened at Cascades, "Protector" George Augustus Robinson starts an Aboriginal mission at Bruny Island, convicts seized the brig Cyprus at Recherche Bay and sail to China, Van Diemen's Land Scientific Society formed under patronage of Lieutenant-Governor George Arthur and a Hobart-New Norfolk coach service began.

1830–1839

 1830: George Augustus Robinson starts reconciliation efforts with Aboriginal people by visiting west coast
 1830: Samuel Anderson, Pioneer Settler, arrives in Hobart aboard the Lang, employed as book keeper with Van Diemens Land Co. Will go on to establish the third permanent settlement in Victoria at Westernport.
 1830: Administration launches "Black Line" military campaign across most of colony to round up Aboriginal people; in seven weeks two are shot and two are captured
 1830: Port Arthur penal settlement established
 1830: Convict chain gang starts work on causeway across Derwent at Bridgewater
 John Glover English landscape painter, arrives in Van Diemen's Land on his 64th birthday
 1831: Australia's first novel, Quintus Servinton, by Henry Savery, published in Hobart
 1831: New land regulations discontinue free land grants, replacing them with sales
 1832: George Augustus Robinson arrives in Hobart with Aboriginal people from Oyster Bay and Big River tribes, the last Aboriginal people removed from European-settled areas; Wybalenna, Flinders Island, chosen for Aboriginal resettlement site.
 1832: Ends of martial law against Aboriginal people
 1832: Work starts on Cascade Brewery
 1832: Regular Hobart-Launceston coach service begins
 1832: Maria Island penal settlement closes
 1832: Derwent Light ("Iron Pot") lit for first time
 1833: Robert Massie arrives in Tasmania takes up position as Engineer with Van Diemens Land Co.
 1833: First professional theatrical performance in Hobart
 1833: Macquarie Harbour penal settlement closes, convicts transferred to Port Arthur
 1834: Convicts evacuating Macquarie Harbour capture brig Frederick and sail to Chile
 1834: Stagecoaches begin daily Hobart-New Norfolk, weekly Hobart-Launceston services
 1834: Daily Hobart-New Norfolk steamship trips begin
 1834: Launceston "female factory" completed
 1834: Point Puer boys' convict establishment opens at Port Arthur
 1834: First coal shipment leaves convict mines on Tasman Peninsula
 1834: Jury trial system for all civil cases begins
 1834: Horse-drawn coaches begin taxi-style service
 1834: Henty brothers leave Launceston for Portland Bay to make first European settlement in Victoria
 1835: Nearly all remaining Tasmanian Aboriginal people surrender to George Augustus Robinson and are moved to Flinders Island
 1835: Transport George III sinks in D'Entrecasteaux Channel with loss of 139 male convicts of 220 aboard
 1835: In separate expeditions, John Batman and John Pascoe Fawkner leave Launceston to launch first European settlements at Port Phillip, which developed into Melbourne.
 1835: Samuel Anderson leaves Launceston to establish third permanent Victorian settlement at Bass in Western Port.
 1835: Colonial artist John Glover sends 35 paintings of Van Diemen's Land to London exhibition.
 1835: First meeting to establish Launceston Bank for Savings.
 1836: First Catholic Church was built—St John the Evangelist's Church in Richmond. It is the oldest running Catholic Church in Australia.
 1836: Charles Darwin visits Hobart during round-the-world voyage in 
 1836: Hobart Post office moves to premises on corner of Elizabeth Street and Collins Street
 1836: Eleven counties, and some parishes therein, proclaimed; establishing the cadastral divisions of the colony
 1837: Theatre Royal opens
 1837: Lieutenant Governor Sir John Franklin founds Tasmanian Society for the Study of Natural Science
 1837: Police office built on corner of Macquarie Street and Murray Street
 1838: The first secular register of births, deaths and marriages in the British colonies established
 1838: First annual Hobart Regatta on Derwent
 1838: Work begins on old Customs House, which becomes Parliament House at start of responsible self-government in 1856
 1838: Sir John Franklin establishes board of education to introduce non-denominational schools
 1838: Bruny Island lighthouse completed

1840–1849
 1840: Economic depression starts, continues until 1845
 1840: Captain James Ross arrives with Antarctic expedition in HMS Erebus and HMS Terror
 1840: Sir John Franklin establishes Ross Bank meteorological observatory site, named after explorer, near present Government House site
 1840: Dr William Bedford founds first Hobart private hospital (in house near Theatre Royal) after dispute at government hospital
 1840: Transportation from Britain to NSW ends, causing heavier influx of convicts to Tasmania
 1842: Colony's first official census, population 57,471
 1842: The Weekly Examiner begins publication in Launceston
 1842: Hobart proclaimed a city
 1842: Tasmanian Journal of Natural Science, first Australian scientific journal, begins publication
 1842: Peak year for convict arrivals (5329)
 1842: Maria Island's Darlington penitentiary reopened
 1843: Arrival of Tasmania's first Anglican bishop, Francis Russell Nixon
 1843: Bushranger Martin Cash captured in Hobart, his death sentence was commuted and he was later pardoned
 1844: First Catholic bishop, Robert Willson, arrives
 1844: Formation of Royal Society of Tasmania, first branch outside Britain, as development of society founded in 1837 by Sir John Franklin; society branch takes over botanical gardens
 1844: Norfolk Island, formerly administered by NSW, comes under Tasmanian control
 1845: Emigrant ship Cataraqui wrecked near King Island, 406 lives lost
 1845: Hobart Savings Bank opens
 1845: Jewish community consecrates Hobart Synagogue, Australia's oldest
 1845: Artist John Skinner Prout organises first known Australian exhibition of pictures in Hobart
 1846: Absconding Act introduced to detain escaping convicts.
 1846: Foundation of the Hutchins School and Launceston Grammar School
 1846: Lieutenant-governor Sir John Eardley-Wilmot dismissed, allegedly for failure to suppress convict homosexuality
 1846: Convict transportation to Tasmania suspended until 1848
 1846: Tasmania becomes first Australian colony to enact legislation to protect native animals
 1847: Britain orders closure of NSW convict establishment and transfer of remaining prisoners to Tasmania
 1847: Big Hobart meeting petitions Queen Victoria for end to transportation
 1847: Wybalenna Aboriginal settlement at Flinders Island closes and surviving 47 Aboriginal people move to Oyster Cove
 1847: News of Sir John Franklin's death during Arctic exploration reaches Hobart
 1847: Charles Davis founds hardware business
 1847: Launceston doctor W. R. Pugh uses ether as general anaesthetic for first time in Tasmania
 1848: Hobart peaks as whaling port, with 1046 men aboard 37 ships
 1848: Colony now only place of transportation in British Empire
 1849: "Young Irelanders" (Irish political prisoners), including William Smith O'Brien, arrive at Port Arthur
 1849: Anti-transportation league formed after Launceston public meeting
 1849: Tasmania gets first public library
 1849: Tasmanian apple growers export to the United States of America and New Zealand

1850–1859
 1850: Prisoner Patrick O'Donoghue starts publishing 'The Irish Exile', first Irish Nationalist paper in Australia.
 1850: First secular high school built at Domain
 1850: Constitution Dock officially opened
 1851: O'Donoghue sent to a chain-gang, released, restarts his paper and sent again to a chain-gang.
 1851: Black Thursday bushfires in February
 1851: Influenza epidemic
 1851: First election for 16 non-appointed members of Legislative Council
 1851: Hobart Chamber of Commerce established
 1851: Launceston host for first intercolonial cricket match (Van Diemen's Land v Port Phillip district)
 1851: Maria Island's Darlington penitentiary abandoned
 1852: Elections for first Hobart and Launceston municipal councils
 1852: Payable gold discovered near Fingal
 1853: Jubilee festival in Hobart celebrates end of convict transportation after arrival of last ship, the St Vincent
 1853: First Tasmanian adhesive postage stamp issued
 1854: Severe floods, fires hit city
 1854: The Mercury founded as bi-weekly publication
 1855: Horse-drawn "buses" (large carts) begin services, mainly on city–New Town route; they later become enclosed vehicles
 1855: Henry Young becomes first vice-regal representative to have title of Governor
 1856: Name of Van Diemen's Land officially changed to Tasmania after grant of responsible self-government
 1856: New two-house Parliament opens after elections, William Champ becomes colony's first Premier
 1856: Norfolk Island transferred from Tasmanian to NSW control
 1857: Hobart's municipal Incorporation
 1857: Hobart-Launceston telegraph line opens
 1857: Hobart customers start using coal gas, streets get gas lighting
 1858: First meeting of Hobarts Marine Board, Australia's oldest port authority
 1858: Hobart and Launceston councils form municipal police forces
 1858: Council of Education established
 1858: Hobart Savings Bank founded
 1858: Parliament passes Rural Municipalities Act
 1859: Worries about public health prompt Hobart Town Council to appoint health officer
 1859: New Government House at Domain occupied for first time, by Governor Henry Young and Lady Young

1860–1869
 1860: British troops sail from Hobart for Māori war in New Zealand
 1860: Volunteer corps of infantry, cavalry and artillery formed
 1860: Economic depression
 1860: The Mercury begins daily publication
 1862: Tasmania adopts Torrens title land-conveyancing and registration system
 1862: Serious Derwent flooding
 1862: Hobart's post office moves to rebuilt courthouse on corner of Macquarie St and Murray St
 1863: Opening of Tasmanian Museum on present site
 1864: First shipment of trout and salmon ova arrives from England
 1866: Hobart Town Hall opened
 1866: Hobart Philharmonic Society formed
 1867: George Peacock launches one of Australia's first jam factories in Hobart (later operated by Henry Jones and Co under the name IXL)
 1868: First royal visit, during which Prince Alfred (Duke of Edinburgh) lays foundation stone for St David's Cathedral and turns first sod for Tasmania's first railway, Launceston-Deloraine line, built by a private company.
 1868: With Education Act, Tasmania becomes first Australian colony to have compulsory state education system, administered by local school boards
 1869: Death of William Lanne ("King Billy"), reputedly the last full blood Tasmanian Aboriginal man; whose remains were disrespected horribly after disagreement over who should have his remains.
 1869: Submarine communications cable successfully establishes link between Tasmania and Melbourne.

1870–1879
 1870: British troops leave
 1870: Tasmanian Public Library formally constituted
 1871: Opening of Launceston–Deloraine railway, Tasmania's first—()
 1871: James "Philosopher" Smith discovers tin at Mount Bischoff
 1872: Direct telegraphic communication begins between Tasmania and England
 1873: Work begins on private operated Hobart–Launceston rail link—()
 1873: Government takes over Launceston-Deloraine line
 1874: St David's Cathedral consecrated
 1874: Tasmanian Racing Club established
 1874: Launceston rioters protest against rates levy for Deloraine railway
 1874: First book publication of Marcus Clarke's For the Term of His Natural Life, set mainly in Tasmania
 1875: Hobart Hospital begins professional training of nurses
 1875: Widespread flooding
 1876: Truganini, described as last Tasmanian full blooded Aboriginal person, dies in Hobart
 1876: Hobart-Launceston railway opens
 1877: Port Arthur penal settlement closed
 1877: Gold discovered at Beaconsfield
 1878: Mount Heemskirk tin mining begins

1880–1889
 1880: Earthquake hits Hobart
 1880: Tasmania gets first telephone with line from city centre to Mount Nelson signal station
 1880: Start of Derwent Sailing Boat Club (later Royal Yacht Club of Tasmania)
 1880: Gold discovered at Pieman River on West Coast, Tasmania
 1881: William Shoobridge organises first trial shipment of apples from Hobart to Britain
 1881: Hobart officially replaces 'Hobart Town' as capital's name
 1882: Married Women's Property Act allows wives to own property in their own right
 1882: Silver-lead discovered at Zeehan
 1882: Hobart Stock Exchange opens
 1883: Typhoid and diphtheria epidemic prompt public health legislation
 1883: Government opens first Hobart and Launceston telephone exchanges
 1883: Trades and Labor Council formed
 1883: Discovery of gold at "Iron Blow" at Mount Lyell amidst increased West Coast, Tasmania mineral prospecting
 1885: Education Department created, centralising control of schools
 1885: Mersey and Deloraine Railway opened—4′6″ gauge
 1885: Oatlands to Parattah Railway opened
 1885: Formation of the Mt Lyell Prospecting Association
 1886: Copper found at Mount Lyell
 1886: Government takes over Tasmanian Museum and Royal Tasmanian Botanical Gardens
 1886: Federal Council of Australasia discusses Federation at its first assembly held in Hobart
 1886: Public Health Act creates local boards of health
 1887: Derwent Valley railway line to New Norfolk opens, extended to Glenora within a year
 1887: Establishment of The Friends School in Hobart by the Society of Friends (Quakers).
 1887: Italian entrepreneur Diego Bernacchi floats company to develop Maria Island
 1888: Hobart gets first technical school
 1888: Reservoir water supply opened
 1888: Launceston proclaimed a city
1889: Launceston Post Office built

1890–1899
 1890: University of Tasmania opens at the Domain
 1890: Government takes over Hobart-Launceston railway
 1890: Legislation provides for payment of Tasmanian parliamentarians
 1891: Bank of Van Diemen's Land collapses, economic depression follows
 1891: Queen Victoria Museum and Art Gallery opens in Launceston
 1891: Apsley Railway opened
 1892: George FitzGerald founds FitzGeralds department store chain, now owned by Harris Scarfe
 1893: Private company begins electric tramway in Hobart, first in an Australian capital city
 1893: Mount Lyell Mining and Railway Company formed
 1893: Government establishes Tasmanian Tourist Association
 1894: Hobart international exhibition opens
 1894: Government introduces flat-rate income tax system
 1895: The premiers conference in Hobart discusses proposals for federal constitution and plebiscite.
 1895: Launceston becomes first southern hemisphere city to get electric light after first Tasmanian hydro-electric station opens at Duck Reach on South Esk River
 1895: All Tasmanian districts move to Australian Eastern Standard Time, ending different time zones in colony
 1896: Entrepreneur George Adams launches Tattersalls lottery venture in Hobart; first lottery held to dispose of assets of failed Bank of Van Diemen's Land
 1896: Ore smelting begins at Mount Lyell
 1897: Hare-Clark voting system used on trial basis for state polls in Hobart and Launceston
 1897: Formation of Southern Tasmania Football Association
 1897: Serious bushfires start on New Year's Eve, end with six lives lost
 1898: Tasmanians vote four to one in favor of referendum on federation with mainland colonies
 1898: Municipal police forces become part of new statewide government force
 1898: Electric street lighting begins in Hobart
 1898: Norwegian-born Carsten Borchgrevink's Antarctic expedition arrives in Hobart on way south; Tasmanian Louis Bernacchi joins as physicist
 1899: First Tasmanian troops leave for Second Boer War in South Africa
 1899: Federation of Australia wins overwhelming Tasmanian approval in the second referendum

1900–1909

 1900: More Tasmanian troops leave for Second Boer War
 1900: Adult male suffrage for House of Assembly adopted, with property qualifications abolished
 1900: End of whaling operations from Hobart
 1900: Bubonic plague scare grips Tasmania
 1900: Macquarie Island becomes a Tasmanian dependency
 1901: Administrator Sir John Dodds reads proclamation of Commonwealth of Australia from Tasmanian Supreme Court steps
 1901: Visit by Duke and Duchess of Cornwall and York (future King George V and Queen Mary)
 1901: First elections for Federal Parliament
 1901: Zeehan conference leads to formation of Tasmanian Workers Political League (forerunner to Labor Party)
 1902: Last Tasmanian troops return from the Boer War
 1902: Robert Carl Sticht completes world's first successful pyritic smelting at Mount Lyell
 1903: Women get House of Assembly voting right (the already had it for federal polls)
 1903: Hobart-Launceston telephone line opens
 1903: Two ships leave Hobart on relief expedition to free British explorer Robert Scott's Discovery from Antarctic ice
 1903: Launceston smallpox epidemic forces cancellation of Tasmanian centenary celebrations, some festivities a year later
 1904: Legislation allows Tasmanian women to become lawyers
 1904: Formation of Tasmanian National Association (forerunner to Liberal Party)
 1904: Native flora and fauna reserve declared at Schouten Island and Freycinet Peninsula
 1905: Wireless telegraphy experiments between Hobart and Tasman Island and between state and mainland
 1905: Hobart General Post Office building opens
 1906: Marconi Co. demonstrated a wireless telegraphy service between Devonport and Queenscliff, Victoria
 1906: Tasman Lighthouse first lit
 1907: New public library, built with money from American philanthropist Andrew Carnegie, opens in Hobart
 1907: Hare-Clark voting system extended to all of Tasmania
 1908: State school fees abolished
 1908: Queen Alexandra Maternity Hospital opens in Hobart
 1908: First Scout troops formed
 1909: Guy Fawkes Day (5 November) fire destroy Hobart market, City Hall later built on site
 1909: First statewide use of Hare-Clark voting system elects first Labor government, led by John Earle; government lasts only one week, with return of conservatives
 1909: Irish blight wipes out potato crop

1910–1919

 1910: Carters' wage strike paralyses Hobart for a week, ends with win for workers
 1910: Legislation sets maximum 48-hour working week and minimum wages in several trades
 1910: Great Lake hydro-electric project starts
 1911: The Christian Brothers founded and opened the St. Virgil's College School in what is now, Barrack Street in Hobart.
 1911: Douglas Mawson's ship Aurora docks in Hobart on way to Antarctic
 1911: Philip Smith teachers' college opens at Domain, Electric trams begin running in Launceston
 1912: Mount Lyell fire traps miners underground, 42 die
 1912: Norwegian Roald Amundsen, first man to reach South Pole, arrives in Hobart on return from Antarctic expedition
 1912: Hobart City Council takes over tramway service
 1912: First Tasmanian Girl Guide company formed
 1913: First government high schools open in Hobart and Launceston
 1913: Hobart City Council buys tram service
 1913: Term "free by servitude" referring to ex-convicts, appears for last time in official documents, after use for more than 100 years
 1914: A. Delfosse Badgery makes Tasmania's first flight from Elwick in a plane he built himself
 1914: First Tasmanian troops leave to fight in World War I
 1914: The town of Bismarck is renamed Collinsvale due to anti-German sentiment inflamed by the war
 1914: State government buys hydro-electric company
 1915: Tasmanian legislation establishes Australia's first special authority to create and manage parks and reserves
 1915: Serious bushfires
 1916: In Tasmania's worst rail disaster, driver and six passengers die, 31 survive injuries, after Launceston-Hobart express crashes near Campania
 1916: First all-Tasmanian battalion (the 40th) leaves for World War I
 1916: Opening of Great Lakes hydro scheme's first stage, Waddamana power station
 1916: State's first national parks declared at Mount Field and Freycinet
 1916: Daylight saving time first introduced as temporary wartime measure
 1917: Electrolytic Zinc Company works at Risdon and Australian Commonwealth Carbide's plant at Electrona established
 1917: Ridgeway reservoir completed
 1919: Worldwide Spanish influenza epidemic reaches Tasmania, affecting one-third of the population and claiming 171 lives
 1919: Ex-World War I airman A. L. Long makes first flight over Bass Strait
 1919: Frozen Tasmanian meat exported for the first time

1920–1929
 1920: Visit by Prince of Wales, future King Edward VIII
 1920: Miena dam completed
 1920: Launceston-born Hudson Fysh helps found Qantas
 1922: Legislation enables women to stand in state elections
 1922: Legacy movement starts with founding of Remembrance Club in Hobart by Major-General Sir John Gellibrand
 1922: Cradle Mountain-Lake St Clair National Park proclaimed
 1923: First concert by Hobart Symphony Orchestra
 1923: Severe flooding in Hobart
 1923: Labor's Joseph Lyons, a future prime minister, becomes state premier
 1924: Private company starts first Tasmanian radio station, 7ZL (now part of ABC), with regular broadcasts from The Mercury building
 1924: Electrolytic Zinc Co makes first superphosphate at Risdon
 1925: Workmen open David Collins' grave during conversion of old St David's Cemetery into St David's Park
 1925: Osmiridium fields discovered at Adamsfield in south-west
 1927: Inquiry into proposed bridge linking Hobart city with eastern shore
 1927: Visit by Duke and Duchess of York (future King George VI and Queen Elizabeth)
 1928: Cadbury's Claremont factory makes first chocolate
 1928: Voting in Tasmanian state elections becomes compulsory (federal voting became compulsory in 1924)
 1929: Disastrous floods, mainly in Northern Tasmania, take 22 lives; dam burst damages Derby township and tin mines
 1929: Hobart gets automatic telephone system
 1929: Great Depression begins
 1929: Legislation creates Hydro-Electric Commission, replacing government department

1930–1939
 1931: Tasmanian Harold Gatty and American Wiley Post make record round-the-world flight (eight days, 15 hours)
 1932: Ivan and Victor Holyman start air service between Launceston and Flinders Island
 1932: Lyell Highway opens, linking Hobart with West Coast
 1932: Former premier Joseph Lyons becomes prime minister, only Tasmanian to hold that office
 1933: Commonwealth Grants Commission appointed to inquire into affairs of claimant states, including Tasmania
 1934: Holyman Airways (a forerunner of Ansett) launches Launceston–Melbourne service, within months, company plane Miss Hobart disappears over Bass Strait with loss of 12 people, including proprietor Victor Holyman
 1934: Election of government led by Albert Ogilvie starts 35 years of continuous Labor governments
 1935: Five die when Holyman Airways plane Loina crashes off Flinders Island.
 1935: Hobart gets first electric trolley buses
 1935: Legislation for three-year state parliament terms
 1936: SS Paringa sinks in Bass Strait while towing tanker, 31 die
 1936: ABC forms orchestra
 1936 (7 September): Last known Tasmanian tiger (thylacine) dies at Hobart's Beaumaris Zoo
 1936: First commercial flights use federal aerodrome at Cambridge
 1936: Submarine telephone cable service begins between Tasmania and Victoria via King Island
 1936: First two area schools (renamed district schools in 1973) open at Sheffield and Hagley
 1937: Open of Mount Wellington summit road, built as Depression relief work project
 1937: Poliomyelitis epidemic
 1937: Five-year state parliamentary terms return
 1938: Production starts at APPM's Burnie mill
 1938: Work begins on a floating arch bridge across Derwent in Hobart
 1939: World War II begins
 1939: Death in office of prime minister Joseph Lyons
 1939: Royal Hobart Hospital opens on present site

1940–1949
 1940: Tasmanian soldiers leave for North African campaign with Australian 6th Division
 1940: German naval raiders Pinguin and Atlantis lay mines off Hobart and other Australian areas. Hobart closed to shipping because of mine threat; Bass Strait closed after mine sinks British steamer Cambridge.
 1941: Tasmanian soldiers leave for Malaya with Australian 8th Division
 1941: Australian Newsprint Mills' Boyer plant becomes first in world to produce newsprint from hardwood
 1942 (January–March): daylight saving time introduced as wartime measure
 1942: Women 18 to 30 called up for war work
 1943: Floating-arch pontoon bridge Hobart Bridge opens
 1943: Enid Lyons (later Dame Enid), widow of Joseph Lyons, elected first woman member of House of Representatives, winning seat of Darwin (now Braddon).
 1944: University of Tasmania begins transfer to Sandy Bay site
 1944: State Library established
 1945: Rani wins first Sydney to Hobart Yacht Race
 1946: Australian National Airways plane crashes at Seven Mile Beach, killing 25
 1946: Last horse-drawn Hobart cab ceases operation
 1946: Poliomyelitis epidemic
 1947: War-affected migrants begin arriving from Europe to work for Hydro-Electric Commission
 1947: Edward Brooker takes over as Labor premier after Robert Cosgrove's resignation to face corruption and bribery charges
 1947: Major flooding in south of state
 1948: Margaret McIntyre wins Legislative Council seat in May, becoming the first woman member of Tasmanian Parliament; airliner crash in NSW in September kills her and 12 others.
 1948: Robert Cosgrove resumes premiership after acquittal on corruption and bribery charges
 1948: ABC forms Tasmanian Symphony Orchestra on permanent basis
 1948: Fire destroys Ocean Pier
 1948: Antarctic research station established on Macquarie Island
 1949: Poliomyelitis epidemic
 1949: Government introduces compulsory X-rays in fight against tuberculosis
 1949: Tasmanian politician Dame Enid Lyons, widow of former prime minister Joseph Lyons, becomes first woman to reach federal ministry rank, as Executive Council vice-president
 1949: Government buys Theatre Royal

1950–1959
 1951: Brighton army camp gets first intake of national service trainees
 1951: Hartz Mountains National Park proclaimed
 1951: Tasmanian Historical Research Association commences
 1951: Serious bushfires
 1951: Italian and German migrants arrive to work under contract for Hydro-Electric Commission
 1952: First woman elected to Hobart City Council
 1952: Severe floods
 1952: Government ends free hospital scheme
 1952: Single state licensing body formed for hotels and clubs
 1953: Tasman Limited diesel train service begins between Hobart and northern towns
 1953: Housing Department created to manage public housing
 1953: Beaconsfield becomes first Australian centre to get fluoridated water
 1954: Queen Elizabeth II becomes first reigning monarch to visit state, accompanied by Prince Philip. As part of 150th anniversary celebrations, she unveils monument to pioneer British settlers
 1954: Hobart Rivulet area damaged as severe floods affect southern and eastern Tasmania
 1954: Metropolitan Transport Trust formed
 1954: Tattersalls Lotteries moves headquarters from Hobart to Melbourne
 1954: Spouses of property owners get right to vote in Legislative Council elections
 1955: Royal commission appointed to inquire into University of Tasmania after request by Professor Sydney Orr
 1955: House of Assembly gets first two women members, Liberals Mabel Miller and Amelia Best
 1955: Hobart becomes first Australian city to get parking meters
 1955: Proclamation of Lake Pedder National Park (later extended to form Southwest National Park).
 1955: First ingot poured at Bell Bay aluminium refinery
 1955: Labor Party's federal conference in Hobart brings Australian Labor Party split over industrial groups to head, leading to formation of Australian Labor Party (Anti-Communist), later Democratic Labor Party
 1955: Lactos cheese factory opens at Burnie
 1956: University of Tasmania Council dismisses Professor Sydney Orr, alleging improper conduct by him with female student; Orr launches unsuccessful court action against university for wrongful dismissal
 1956: Tasmania gets first woman mayor, Dorothy Edwards of Launceston
 1957: Water Act establishes Rivers and Water Supply Commission
 1958: Hobart waterside works block two Australian Labor Party (Anti-Communist) members, father Frank Hursey and son Denis, from working in dispute over their objection to paying union levy that would partly go to ALP; police guard Hurseys after court order; Supreme Court awards them damages
 1959: MG Car Club of Tasmania formed
 1959: Princess of Tasmania becomes first roll-on/roll-off passenger ferry on Bass Strait run
 1959: High Court verdict in Hursey case upholds unions' right to levy members for political purposes, expel those who refuse to pay
 1959: Federal Government reduces claimant states to two, Tasmania and Western Australia

1960–1969
 1960: Severe floods in Derwent Valley and Hobart, with business basements under water and houses washed away
 1960: Television stations ABT-2 (ABC) and TVT-6 (now WIN) start programs from Mount Wellington transmitters
 1960: New jail opens at Risdon
 1960: Hobart trams cease, succeeded by electric trolley buses
 1960: First meeting of Inland Fisheries Commission
 1960: Opening of new State Library headquarters
 1960: First city parking station opens in Argyle Street
 1961: Construction of Hobart-Sydney ferry terminal begins
 1962: Australian Paper Makers Ltd's Port Huon mill opens
 1962: TEMCO's Bell Bay ferro-manganese plant begins production
 1962: Government subsidises municipal fluoridation schemes
 1963: University of Tasmania completes move to Sandy Bay site; Universities Commission recommends medical school
 1964: Tasman Bridge opens for traffic, old pontoon bridge towed away
 1964: Hobart's water supply fluoridated
 1964: Glenorchy proclaimed city
 1965: First Tasmanians leave for Vietnam War under national service scheme
 1965: Ferry Empress of Australia makes first Sydney–Hobart voyage
 1965: Official opening of Tasmanian Conservatorium of Music
 1965: Bass Strait oil drilling begins
 1966: Huge copper reserves found in Mount Lyell area
 1966: Savage River iron ore agreements involving $62 million signed
 1967 (February): Black Tuesday bushfires claim 62 lives—53 in Hobart area—and destroy more than 1300 homes
 1967: Tasmanian joins other states in approving full constitutional rights for Aboriginal people
 1967: Hydro-Electric Commission tables plans in State Parliament to dam Lake Pedder in South-West
 1967: Daylight saving time and breathalyser tests introduced
 1968: Full adult franchise introduced for Legislative Council elections
 1968: Hobart trolley buses cease, replaced by diesel vehicles
 1968: State abolishes death penalty
 1968: Savage River iron ore project officially opens
 1968: Batman Bridge across lower Tamar River opens
 1969: Tasmanians vote Labor Party out after 35 years in office, Liberal-Centre Party forms coalition government
 1969: Worst floods in 40 years hit Launceston

1970–1979

 1970: Parliament legislates for permanent daylight saving time
 1970: State marine research laboratories at Taroona open
 1970: Electrolytic Zinc Company opens $6 million residue treatment plant
 1971: First woodchip shipment leaves Tasmanian Pulp and Forest Holdings' mill at Triabunna
 1971: APPM Ltd's Wesley Vale paper plant opens
 1971: First state Aboriginal conference held in Launceston
 1972: Conservationists lose battle to prevent flooding of Lake Pedder in South-West for hydro-electric scheme
 1972: Liberal-Centre Party coalition government collapses
 1972: Tasmanian College of Advanced Education opens in Hobart
 1972: Ferry Princess of Tasmania makes last Tasmanian voyage
 1972: Tasmanian Aboriginal Centre opens at Tasmanian Aboriginal Information Centre
 1973: Coastal freighter Blythe Star sinks with loss of three men, seven survivors spend eight days adrift in lifeboat before coming ashore on Forestier Peninsula
 1973: Australia's first legal casino opens at Wrest Point Hotel Casino
 1973: Sir Stanley Burbury, formerly chief justice, becomes first Australian-born governor of Tasmania
 1974: Three die when boiler explosion demolishes laundry at Mt St Canice Convent, Sandy Bay
 1974: Tasmanian workers under state wages board awards get four weeks annual leave; woman awarded equal pay
 1974: Hobart suburban rail services cease
 1975: Freighter MV Lake Illawarra crashes into Tasman Bridge, causing 12 deaths and bringing down part of bridge; temporary Bailey bridge put across Derwent
 1975: Police academy completed at Rokeby
 1975: Hotels allowed to open for Sunday trading
 1975: Totalizator Agency Board begins operating
 1976: Members of Aboriginal community ritually cremate Truganini's remains, scatter ashes in D'Entrecasteaux Channel
 1976: Tasmanian Wilderness Society formed
 1976: Freight equalisation scheme subsidises sea cargo to and from state
 1977: Repaired Tasman Bridge reopens to traffic
 1977: Royal visit, during which Aboriginal activist Michael Mansell presents the Queen with land rights claim
 1977: Tasmanian Film Corporation launched
 1978: Australian National Railways takes over Tasmanian rail system; Tasman Limited ceases operations, ending regular passenger train services in state
 1978: Hydro-Electric Commission proposes power scheme involving Gordon, Franklin and King rivers
 1979: Tasmanian College of Advanced Education moves to Launceston
 1979: State's first ombudsman begins duties
 1979: Hobart gets increased Saturday morning shopping
 1979: Government expands South-West conservation area to more than one-fifth of state's total area

1980–1989
 1980: Australian Antarctic Division headquarters completed at Kingston
 1980: Labor MHA Gillian James becomes first woman to become State Government minister
 1980: Australian Maritime College opens at Beauty Point
 1980: Australian Heritage Commission includes Tasmania on National Estate register
 1981: Plebiscite on preferred new hydro-electric power development scheme shows 47% of voters favour Gordon-below-Franklin development, 8% prefer Gordon-above-Olga, with 45% casting informal votes, including 'no dams' write-ins.
 1981: Devonport proclaimed city
 1981: Bushfires destroy 40 Zeehan homes
 1982: Proclamation of Tasmanian Wilderness World Heritage Area, including South-West, Franklin-Lower Gordon Wild Rivers and Cradle Mountain-Lake St Clair national parks; conservationists blockade Gordon-below-Franklin hydro-electric dam work
 1982: Tasmanians elect Liberals as government in their own right for first time in state's history
 1983: Federal regulations block Franklin Dam construction; High Court rules in favour of federal sovereignty, ending the proposed Gordon-below-Franklin scheme
 1983: Tasmanian Aboriginal Land Council established
 1983: Visit by The Prince and Princess of Wales
 1984: Official opening of Bowen Bridge
 1984: Official opening of Wrest Point Convention Centre
 1984: Fire damages Theatre Royal
 1984: Atlantic salmon eggs introduced to Tasmania
 1985: Four-day cremation ceremony at Oyster Cove, south of Hobart, for Aboriginal remains recovered from museums
 1985: CSIRO Marine Laboratories open in Hobart
 1985: Last voyage by ferry Empress of Australia before replacement by Abel Tasman
 1985: Last Tasmanian drive-in theatres close in Hobart and Launceston
 1985: Municipal rationalisation advances with Launceston taking over St Leonards and Lilydale
 1986: Pope John Paul II holds mass for 32,000 people at Elwick racecourse during Hobart visit
 1986: Archaeologists discover Aboriginal rock paintings in South-West believed to be 20,000 years old
 1987: Launching of Lady Nelson replica ship
 1987: High Court decision bans logging in Lemonthyme, southern forests
 1987: Antarctic supply ship Nella Dan sinks off Macquarie Island
 1988: International fleet of about 200 sailing, cruise and naval ships from about 20 countries calls at Hobart as part of Australian Bicentennial celebrations; more than 150 leave on race to Sydney
 1988: Clarence and Burnie proclaimed cities
 1988: Tasmanian Sporting Hall of Fame opens
 1989: State election ends with Labor-Green accord involving five independents; their no-confidence vote in Robin Gray's minority Liberal government gives Labor's Michael Field premiership

1990–1999
 1990: Sea Cat Tasmania, built in Hobart by Incat, begins summer crossings of Bass Strait
 1990: King Island scheelite mine closes
 1990: World Rowing Championships held on Lake Barrington, near Sheffield
 1991: Savings Bank of Tasmania and Tasmanian Bank amalgamate as Trust Bank
 1991: Port Huon paper mill, Electrona silicon smelter, Renison tin mine and Devonport Ovaltine factory close
 1992: Aboriginal people occupy Risdon Cove in protest over land claims
 1992: Royal Hobart Hospital nursing school closes, ending hospital-based nursing training in Tasmania
 1992: Seven women ordained as Anglican priests at St David's Cathedral
 1992: State's unemployment rate reaches 12.2% as jobs decline in public and private sectors; rallies of angry workers force temporary closure of House of Assembly
 1993: Christine Milne (Tasmanian Greens) becomes first female leader of a Tasmanian political party
 1993: Spirit of Tasmania replaces Abel Tasman on Bass Strait ferry service
 1993: Tasmania's unemployment rate reaches 13.4%
 1993: State Government reduces total of municipalities from 46 to 29, number of departments from 17 to 12
 1994: End to 80 years of dam building as state's last power station, Tribute, opens near Tullah
 1994: HMAS Huon naval base decommissioned
 1995: All-day Saturday shop trading begins
 1995: Government announces legislation to transfer 38 km2 of culturally significant land to Aboriginal community, including Risdon Cove and Oyster Cove
 1995: States unemployment rate falls to 9.6% as number of Tasmanians in work sets record
 1996 (28 April): Gunman Martin Bryant kills 35 people and injures 20 more in shooting rampage at Port Arthur historic site; Supreme Court sentences him to life imprisonment' 1996: Former federal Liberal minister Peter Nixon heads Commonwealth state inquiry into Tasmanian economy
 1997: Tasmania becomes first state to formally apologise to Aboriginal community for past actions connected with the 'stolen generation'.
 1997: Hobart Ports Corporation succeeds marine board
 1997: State Parliament repeals two century-old laws that together made all male homosexual activity criminal
 1997: Royal Hobart Hospital announces part privatisation
 1997: Official opening of Hobart's Aquatic Centre
 1997: Nixon report recommendations include single chamber State Parliament with 27 members, government asset sales
 1997: About 800 gaming machines introduced into 55 Tasmanian hotels, clubs amid predictions of major social problems
 1998: Federal Government sells Hobart and Launceston airports
 1998: Subsidiary Kendell Airlines takes over Ansett's Tasmanian services
 1998: Parliament reduced from 54 members to 40–25 Members of the House of Assembly and 15 Members of the Legislative Council
 1998: Legislation passed to separate Hydro-Electric Commission into three bodies: Aurora Energy, Transend Networks and Hydro Tasmania.
 1998: Bushfires destroy six houses in Hobart suburbs, burn out 30 km2
 1998 (December): Storms and massive seas claim six lives in Sydney to Hobart Yacht Race
 1999: Wild winds and heavy rain caused chaos across Tasmania, one casualty being the Ferris Wheel at the Royal Hobart Regatta which blew over onto the Gee Whizzer ride. 113 km/h winds in Hobart, 158 km/h winds on Mount Wellington.
 1999: Tasmanian cricketer David Boon announced his retirement from Sheffield Shield cricket
 March 1999: Tasmania is almost booked out for the millennium New Year's Eve party—a once-in-1000-year event for Tasmania's key resorts, hotels, motels and restaurants
 1999: Albanian refugees from Kosovo housed at Brighton military camp, renamed Tasmanian Peace Haven
 1999: Legislation passed to give Aboriginal community control of Wybalenna, Flinders Island
 1999: Colonial State Bank of NSW takes over Trust Bank
 1999: Official opening of Port Arthur Visitor Centre
 1999: Queen Alexandra Hospital building leased to private operators
 1999 (25 October): Labor part stalwart Eric Reece, hailed as Tasmania's greatest premier, died in Hobart, aged 90
 1999: Proclamation of Tasmanian Seamounts Marine Reserve, Australia's first deep-sea reserve
 1999: Tasmania voted the best temperate island in the world by the world's largest travel magazine, Conde Nast Traveler2000–present
 2000 (1 January): Tasmania beamed to 43 television networks around the world to herald the new millennium
 2000: Elizabeth II, Queen of Australia visits Hobart
 2000: Tasmania hosts its first Sorry Day at Risdon Cove
 2000: Olympic Torch comes to Tasmania
 2000: New Federation Concert Hall opens in Hobart
 2001 (10 May): Centenary of Federation celebrated
 2001: For the first time in 120 years, Tasmanian Australian rules football clubs take the national stage playing home and away VFL games
 2001: Tasmanian company Gunns clinches $335 million deal to become one of the giants of the Australian forestry industry
 2001: Impulse Airlines begins, cutting one way Hobart-Melbourne fares to $40, but is subsumed by Qantas
 2001: 10 Days on the Island begins. It is Tasmania's biggest cultural festival in a century
 2001: State Government announces $53 million jail to replace the old Risdon Jail
 2001: New traffic laws introduced, drivers face automatic disqualification if travelling 38 km/h over the limit
 2001: Meningoccocal hits Tasmania with the first of many deaths
 2002: House and land boom begins with East Coast blocks selling for almost three times the town's previous record
 2002 (May): : Tasmania's suburban street speed limit dropped to 50 km/h in a bid to increase road safety
 2002: Tasmania hit by drought
 2002 (16 May): Death of Australia's last ANZAC, Tasmania's Alec Campbell, aged 103.
 2002 (3 August): Tasmanian boxer Daniel Geale wins Tasmania's only gold medal at the Commonwealth Games in Manchester, England.
 2002: Virgin Blue begins operating in Tasmania offering introductory $66 one-way fares to Melbourne
 2002 (1 September): Tasmania's fast ferries Spirit of Tasmania I and II replace original Spirit of Tasmania on Bass Strait trade. 
 2002 (12 October): Tasmanian Tim Hawkins killed in Bali bombing
 2002: Deregulated shop trading hours begin
 2003 (January): People urged by Tasmanian Fire Service to abandon their Australia Day long-weekend plans and prepare their homes for a potential firestorm as a number of fires pose the worst fire threat in 30 years
 2003: Official opening of the restored Queenstown to Regatta Point railway line West Coast Wilderness Railway.
 2003: Attempted hijack of a Qantas flight from Melbourne to Launceston
 2003: Federal Hotels gets exclusive control of state's gaming machines for 15 years with a further 5-year option
 2003: Richard Butler becomes Tasmania's new governor
 2003: Regina Bird wins reality-TV show Big Brother, becomes first Tasmanian to do so
 2003: Tasmania passed some of the most progressive relationship laws in the world including same-sex adoptions and registration of 'significant' relationships
 2003: Engagement of Tasmania's Mary Donaldson to Denmark's Prince Frederik
 2004 (13 January): Spirit of Tasmania III makes its first voyage from Sydney to Devonport
 2004: State Government announces legislation to legalise brothels; leading to a back flip in 2005 when the government chose to ban brothels altogether.
 2004 (14 May): Wedding of Tasmania's Mary Donaldson to Denmark's Prince Frederik in Copenhagen.
 2004 (20 May): Premier Jim Bacon dies in Hobart of lung cancer
 2004 (8 August): Tasmanian governor Richard Butler resigns at the request the premier, who agreed to pay "compensation" of $600,000 in lost salary
 2005 (15 October): Tasmanian Mary Donaldson and Prince Frederik give birth to a male infant Prince Christian who will be in the line of succession to the Danish throne
 2006 (26 April): Beaconsfield mine collapse—One miner killed, two trapped underground for a fortnight.
 2006 (27 August): Final crossing of the Spirit of Tasmania III from Sydney to Devonport
 2011 (22 January) : The Museum of Old and New Art (MONA) opens to the public.
 2012 : Tasmania's largest company, Gunns, enters voluntary administration.

See also
 History of Hobart
 Historical bibliographies of Tasmania

References and sources
References

Sources
 
 Robson, L. L. (1983). A History of Tasmania. Volume I. Van Diemen's Land From the Earliest Times to 1855. Melbourne: Oxford University Press. .
 Robson, L. L. (1991). A History of Tasmania. Volume II. Colony and State From 1856 to the 1980s''. Melbourne: Oxford University Press. .
 Fenton, James. A history of Tasmania from its discovery in 1642 to the present time. London: Macmillan and Co., 1884. (link)

 
Articles containing video clips
Tasmanian timelines